Eupithecia tritaria is a moth in the family Geometridae. It is found in Venezuela.

References

Moths described in 1863
tritaria
Moths of South America